David Guy Blomfield  (11 July 1934 – 12 July 2016) was leader of the Liberal Party group on Richmond upon Thames Council, a writer, a book editor and a local historian.

Early life and education
David Blomfield was born in Camberley, Surrey. His parents were Valentine Blomfield, a British Army officer, and his wife, Gladys (née Lang), who had been a Voluntary Aid Detachment nurse at Richmond's Star and Garter Home in the First World War. His father's family was descended from the Anglican bishops Charles James Blomfield and Alfred Blomfield and the architect Sir Reginald Blomfield.

He was educated at Wellington College, Berkshire  and served in the Royal Artillery and the Oxfordshire Yeomanry. He studied classics at Hertford College, Oxford University and graduated in 1955.

Career
Blomfield worked in the condensed books department of Reader's Digest from 1959 to 1987 and subsequently became a freelance book editor.

He was elected to represent Kew ward on Richmond upon Thames Council from 1971 to 1978 and then from 1979 to 1986. As leader of the Liberal group he was Leader of the Opposition on Richmond upon Thames Council in 1978.

Blomfield, who researched, wrote and published books on the history of Kew,  chaired the Richmond Local History Society from 2003 to 2013, edited its annual journal Richmond History and succeeded John Cloake in 2015 as the Society's President. He was also a patron of the Kew Society and a past chairman of the Orange Tree Theatre in Richmond.

Honours and awards
He was appointed Member of the Order of the British Empire in 2000.

Personal life

He lived in Kew, London with his wife Caroline, with whom he had three children (two sons and a daughter). He died on 12 July 2016, a day after celebrating his 82nd birthday.

Publications

Books
 Blomfield, David (ed.) (1992). Lahore to Lucknow: The Indian Mutiny Journal of Arthur Moffat Lang. Pen & Sword Books Ltd. 
 Blomfield, David (1994), Kew Past. Chichester, Sussex: Phillimore & Co. Ltd.

Articles

References

1934 births
2016 deaths
Military personnel from Surrey
Burials at Richmond Cemetery
20th-century English historians
21st-century English historians
Alumni of Hertford College, Oxford
Blomfield family
Councillors in the London Borough of Richmond upon Thames
English book editors
English military historians
Historians of London
Liberal Democrats (UK) councillors
Liberal Party (UK) councillors
Members of the Order of the British Empire
People educated at Wellington College, Berkshire
People from Camberley
People from Kew, London
Reader's Digest
Royal Artillery personnel
Churchwardens
Ghostwriters